Don Delos Eldridge (December 26, 1919 – October 16, 2007) was an American politician.

Early life and education
He was born in Mount Vernon, Washington. He graduated from Mount Vernon High School and Mount Vernon Junior College. While at junior college, he completed the first phase of civilian pilot training in anticipation of joining the United States Army Air Corps. He attended Washington State University for one year and received a degree in education from Western Washington College of Education. He then worked in his family's stationary business and local newspaper in Mount Vernon.

Career
He served in the Washington House of Representatives 1952–1970 as a Republican and was the speaker. In 1970, Eldridge was appointed to the Washington State Liquor Control Board and served until 1979. He was a member of the first Washington Redistricting Commission in 1983. He was in the property management business in Olympia, Washington. He died in Olympia, Washington.

Notes

1919 births
2007 deaths
People from Mount Vernon, Washington
People from Olympia, Washington
Washington State University alumni
Western Washington University alumni
Businesspeople from Washington (state)
Speakers of the Washington House of Representatives
Republican Party members of the Washington House of Representatives
20th-century American politicians
20th-century American businesspeople
United States Army Air Forces soldiers